This is the list of people who have contributed to Bhojpuri literature.

A

 Acharya Shivpujan Sahay
Aryadeva
Avinash Chandra Vidyarthi

B 

 Baleshwar Yadav
Beniram
 Bhikhari Thakur
 Bihari Lal Yadav
 Bisram
 Bulaki Das

C 

 Chauranginath

D 

 Dariya Saheb
 Dharamdas
 Dharikshan Mishr
 Dharni Das
 Dinesh Bhramar

G 

 Guru Gobind Singh
Gorakhnath

H

Harihar Singh
Heera Dom

K 

Kabir Das
Krishnadev Prasad Gaud
Kukkuripa

L 
 Lachhimi Sakhi
 Lal Khadag Bahadur Malla
Lawapa
Luipa

M 
Mahendar Misir
Manoj Bhawuk
Manoranjan Prasad Sinha
Matsyendranath
Moti BA

N 

 Nilotpal Mrinal

P 
Pandey Kapil
Parichay Das
Prasiddha Narayan Singh

R 
Raghuveer Narayan
Rahul Sankrityayan
Raj Mohan
Ram Gharib Chaube
Ramesh Chandra Jha
Rameshwar Singh Kashyap
Ravidas

T 
Teg Ali Teg

V 
 Vimlanand Saraswati
Viveki Rai

Bhojpuri
Bhojpuri-language culture